Charing Cross is a junction in Westminster, London, England, where six routes meet. Clockwise from north these are: the east side of Trafalgar Square leading to St Martin's Place and then Charing Cross Road; the Strand leading to the City; Northumberland Avenue leading to the Thames Embankment; Whitehall leading to Parliament Square; The Mall leading to Admiralty Arch and Buckingham Palace; and two short roads leading to Pall Mall.  The name also commonly refers to the Queen Eleanor Memorial Cross at Charing Cross station.

A bronze equestrian statue of Charles I, erected in 1675, stands on a high plinth, situated roughly where a medieval monumental cross had previously stood for 353 years (since its construction in 1294) until destroyed in 1647 by Cromwell and his revolutionary government. The famously beheaded King, appearing ascendant, is the work of French sculptor Hubert Le Sueur.

The aforementioned eponymous monument, the "Charing Cross", was the largest and most ornate instance of a chain of medieval Eleanor crosses running from Lincoln to this location. It was a landmark for many centuries of the hamlet of Charing, Westminster, which later gave way to government property; a little of The Strand; and Trafalgar Square. The cross in its various historical forms has also lent its name to its locality, and especially Charing Cross Station. On the forecourt of this terminus station stands the ornate Queen Eleanor Memorial Cross, a taller emulation of the original, and built to mark the station's opening in 1864 – at the height and in the epicentre of the Gothic Revival – after the Palace of Westminster's rebuilding and before Westminster Cathedral's construction.

Charing Cross is marked on contemporary maps as a road junction, though it is also a thoroughfare in postal addresses: Drummonds Bank, on the corner with The Mall, retains the address 49 Charing Cross and 1-4 Charing Cross continues to exist. The name previously applied to the whole stretch of road between Great Scotland Yard and Trafalgar Square, but since 1 January 1931 most of this section of road has been designated part of the 'Whitehall' thoroughfare. Since the early 19th century, Charing Cross has been the notional "centre of London" and is now the point from which distances from London are measured.

History

Location and etymology

The name of the lost hamlet, Charing, is derived from the Old English word cierring, a river bend, in this case thus meaning: in the Thames.

The suffix "Cross" refers to the Eleanor cross made during 1291–94 by order of King Edward I as a memorial to his wife, Eleanor of Castile. At the time, this place comprised little more than wayside cottages serving the Royal Mews in the northern area of today's Trafalgar Square, and built specifically for the Palace of Whitehall (today much of the east side of Whitehall). A debunked folk etymology ran that the name is a corruption of chère reine ("dear queen" in French), but the name pre-dates Eleanor's death by at least a hundred years. A variant form in the hazy Middle English orthography of the late fourteenth century is Cherryngescrouche.

The stone cross was the work of the medieval sculptor, Alexander of Abingdon. It was destroyed in 1647 on the orders of the purely Parliamentarian phase of the Long Parliament or Oliver Cromwell himself in the Civil War. A -high stone sculpture in front of Charing Cross railway station, erected in 1865, is a reimagining of the medieval cross, on a larger scale, more ornate, and not on the original site. It was designed by the architect E. M. Barry and carved by Thomas Earp of Lambeth out of Portland stone, Mansfield stone (a fine sandstone) and Aberdeen granite; and it stands 222 yards (203 metres) to the north-east of the original cross, focal to the station forecourt, facing the Strand.

Since 1675 the site of the cross has been occupied by a statue of King Charles I mounted on a horse. The site is recognised by modern convention as the centre of London for the purpose of indicating distances (whether geodesically or by road network) in preference to other measurement points (such as St Paul's Cathedral which remains as the root of the English and Welsh part of the Great Britain road numbering scheme). Charing Cross is marked on modern maps as a road junction, and was used in street numbering for today's section of Whitehall between Great Scotland Yard and Trafalgar Square. Since 1 January 1931 this segment has more logically and officially become the northern end of Whitehall.

The rebuilding of a monument to resemble the one lost under Cromwell's low church Britain took place in 1864 in Britain's main era of medieval revivalism. The next year the memorial was completed and Cardinal Wiseman died, the first Archbishop of Westminster, having been appointed such in 1850, with many Anglican churches also having restored or re-created their medieval ornamentations by the end of the century. By this time England was the epicentre of the Gothic Revival. It was intertwined with deeply philosophical movements associated with a re-awakening of "High Church" or Anglo-Catholic self-belief (and by the Catholic convert Augustus Welby Pugin) concerned by the growth of religious nonconformism.

The cross, having been revived, gave its name to a railway station, a tube station, a police station, a hospital, a hotel, a theatre, and a music hall (which had lain beneath the arches of the railway station). Charing Cross Road, the main route from the north (which became the east side of Trafalgar Square), was named after the railway station, itself a major destination for traffic, rather than after the original cross.

St Mary Rounceval

At some time between 1232 and 1236, the Chapel and Hospital of St Mary Rounceval was founded at Charing. It occupied land at the corner of the modern Whitehall and into the centre of Northumberland Avenue, running down to a wharf by the river. It was an Augustinian house, tied to a mother house at Roncesvalles in the Pyrenees. The house and lands were seized for the king in 1379, under a statute "for the forfeiture of the lands of schismatic aliens". Protracted legal action returned some rights to the prior, but in 1414, Henry V suppressed the 'alien' houses. The priory fell into a long decline owing to lack of money and arguments regarding the collection of tithes with the parish church of St Martin-in-the-Fields. In 1541, religious artefacts were removed to St Margaret's, and the chapel was adapted as a private house; its almshouse were sequestered to the Royal Palace.

In 1608–09, the Earl of Northampton built Northumberland House on the eastern portion of the property. In June 1874, the whole of the duke's property at Charing Cross was purchased by the Metropolitan Board of Works for the formation of Northumberland Avenue.

The frontage of the Rounceval property caused the narrowing at the end of the Whitehall entry to Charing Cross, and formed the section of Whitehall formerly known as Charing Cross, until road widening in the 1930s caused the rebuilding of the south side of the street, creating the current wide thoroughfare.

Battle
In 1554, Charing Cross was the site of the final battle of Wyatt's Rebellion. This was an attempt by Thomas Wyatt and others to overthrow Queen Mary I of England, soon after her accession to the throne, and replace her with Lady Jane Grey. Wyatt's army had come from Kent, and with London Bridge barred to them, had crossed the river by what was then the next bridge upstream, at Hampton Court. Their circuitous route brought them down St Martin's Lane to Whitehall.

The palace was defended by 1000 men under Sir John Gage at Charing Cross; they retreated within Whitehall after firing their shot, causing consternation within, thinking the force had changed sides. The rebels – themselves fearful of artillery on the higher ground around St James's – did not press their attack and marched on to Ludgate, where they were met by the Tower Garrison and surrendered.

Civil war removal

The Eleanor Cross was pulled down, by order of Parliament, in 1647, at the time of the English Civil War, becoming the subject of a popular Royalist ballad:

At the Restoration (1660 or shortly after) eight of the regicides were executed here, including the notable Fifth Monarchist, Colonel Thomas Harrison. A statue of Charles I was, likewise in Charles II's reign, erected on the site. This had been made in 1633 by Hubert Le Sueur, in the reign of Charles I, but in 1649 Parliament ordered a man to destroy it; however he instead hid it and brought it back to the new King, Charles II (Charles I's son), and his Parliament who had the statue erected here in 1675.

A prominent pillory, where malefactors were publicly flogged, stood alongside for centuries. About 200 yards to the east was the Hungerford Market, established at the end of the 16th century; and to the north was the King's Mews, or Royal Mews, the stables for the Palace of Whitehall and thus the King's own presence at the Houses of Parliament (Palace of Westminster). The whole area of the broad pavements of what was a three-way main junction with private (stables) turn-off was a popular place of street entertainment. Samuel Pepys records in his diaries visiting the taverns and watching the entertainments and executions that were held there. This was combined with the south of the mews when Trafalgar Square was built on the site in 1832, the rest of the stable yard becoming the National Gallery primarily.

A major London coaching inn, the "Golden Cross" – first mentioned in 1643 – faced this junction. From here, in the eighteenth and nineteenth centuries, coaches linked variously terminuses of: Dover, Brighton, Bath, Bristol, Cambridge, Holyhead and York. The inn features in Sketches by Boz, David Copperfield and The Pickwick Papers by Charles Dickens. In the latter, the dangers to public safety of the quite low archway to access the inn's coaching yard were memorably pointed out by Mr Jingle:
"Heads, heads – take care of your heads", cried the loquacious stranger as they came out under the low archway which in those days formed the entrance to the coachyard. "Terrible place – dangerous work – other day – five children – mother – tall lady, eating sandwiches – forgot the arch – crash – knock – children look round – mother's head off – sandwich in her hand – no mouth to put it in – head of family off."

The story echoes an accident of 11 April 1800, when the Chatham and Rochester coach was emerging from the gateway of the Golden Cross, and "a young woman, sitting on the top, threw her head back, to prevent her striking against the beam; but there being so much luggage on the roof of the coach as to hinder her laying herself sufficiently back, it caught her face, and tore the flesh in a dreadful manner."

The inn and its yard, pillory, and what remained of the Royal Mews, made way for Trafalgar Square, and a new Golden Cross Hotel was built in the 1830s on the triangular block fronted by South Africa House. A nod to this is made by some offices on the Strand, in a building named Golden Cross House.

Replacement

The railway station opened in 1864, fronted on the Strand with the Charing Cross Hotel. In 1865, a replacement cross was commissioned from E. M. Barry by the South Eastern Railway as the centrepiece of the station forecourt. It is not a replica, being of an ornate Victorian Gothic design based on George Gilbert Scott's Oxford Martyrs' Memorial (1838). The Cross rises  in three main stages on an octagonal plan, surmounted by a spire and cross. The shields in the panels of the first stage are copied from the Eleanor Crosses and bear the arms of England, Castile, Leon and Ponthieu; above the 2nd parapet are eight statues of Queen Eleanor. The Cross was designated a Grade II* monument on 5 February 1970. The month before, the bronze equestrian statue of Charles, on a pedestal of carved Portland stone, was given Grade I listed protection.

Official use as central point
By the late 18th century, the Charing Cross district was increasingly coming to be perceived as the "centre" of the metropolis (supplanting the traditional heartland of the City to the east). From the early 19th century, legislation applicable only to the London metropolis used Charing Cross as a central point to define its geographical scope. Its later use in legislation waned in favour of providing a schedule of local government areas and became mostly obsolete with the creation of Greater London in 1965.

Road distances from London continue to be measured from Charing Cross. Prior to its selection as a commonly agreed central datum point, various points were used for this purpose. John Ogilby's Britannia of 1675, of which editions and derivations continued to be published throughout the 18th century, used the "Standard" (a former conduit head) in Cornhill; while John Cary's New Itinerary of 1798 used the General Post Office in Lombard Street. The milestones on the main turnpike roads were mostly measured from their terminus which was peripheral to the free-passage urban, London roads. Ten of these are notable: Hyde Park Corner, Whitechapel Church, the southern end of London Bridge, the east end of Westminster Bridge, Shoreditch Church, Tyburn Turnpike (Marble Arch), Holborn Bars, St Giles's Pound, Hicks Hall (as to the Great North Road), and the Stones' End in The Borough. Some roads into Surrey and Sussex were measured from St Mary-le-Bow church in the City. Some of these structures were later moved or destroyed, but reference to them persisted as if they still remained in place. An exaggerated but well-meaning criticism was that "all the Books of Roads ... published, differ in the Situation of Mile Stones, and instead of being a Guide to the Traveller, serve only to confound him".

William Camden speculated in 1586 that Roman roads in Britain had been measured from London Stone, a claim thus widely repeated, but unsupported by archaeological or other evidence.

Neighbouring locations

Transport

To the east of the Charing Cross road junction is Charing Cross railway station, situated on The Strand. On the other side of the river, connected by the pedestrian Golden Jubilee Bridges, are Waterloo East and Waterloo stations.

The nearest London Underground stations are Charing Cross and Embankment.

References

External links 

Charing Cross Bridge in London from Claude Monet, in YOUR CITY AT THE THYSSEN, a Thyssen Museum project on Flickr
'The statue of Charles I and site of the Charing Cross', Survey of London: volume 16: St Martin-in-the-Fields I: Charing Cross (1935), pp. 258–268. URL: The statue of Charles I and site of the Charing Cross | British History Online. Retrieved 6 March 2014.

Areas of London
Districts of the City of Westminster
Kilometre-zero markers
Monuments and memorials in London
Execution sites in England
London crime history